The 2010 Tequila Patrón American Le Mans Series at Long Beach was the second round of the 2010 American Le Mans Series season. It took place at the Long Beach Street Circuit on April 17, 2010.

Qualifying
The qualifying session saw Adrian Fernández take the overall pole for Aston Martin Racing. Christophe Bouchut gave Level 5 Motorsports the LMPC pole, Jaime Melo gave Risi Competizione the GT pole and Andy Lally gave TRG the GTC pole after the Black Swan Racing entry was demoted to the back of the grid after it was found they used improper fuel in qualifying.

Qualifying result
Pole position winners in each class are marked in bold.

Race
The race was won by the #1 Highcroft Acura but only by a margin of 0.353 seconds over the #007 Aston Martin. The #99 Green Earth Team Gunnar car was the first LMPC car to cross the line finishing fifth overall, one lap ahead of the next nearest LMPC car. The #45 Flying Lizard Porsche won in the GT class and the #81 Alex Job Racing car took the GTC win.

Race result
Class winners in bold.  Cars failing to complete 70% of their class winner's distance are marked as Not Classified (NC).

References

Long Beach
Grand Prix of Long Beach